Marcus Evans is an English businessman, chairman of Ipswich Town FC.

Marcus Evans may also refer to:

 Marcus C. Evans Jr., American politician
 Marcus Evans (basketball), American basketball player
 Marcus Evans (footballer), Australian footballer
 Marcus S. Evans, American major-general
 Marcus Evans, British psychologist, former member of the Tavistock Clinic governance board  - see NHS Gender Identity Development Service#Recent history

See also 
 Mark Evans (disambiguation)